Chaz Salvatore Bono (born Chastity Sun Bono; March 4, 1969) is an American writer, musician and actor. His parents are entertainers Sonny Bono and Cher, and he became widely known in appearances as a child on their television show, The Sonny & Cher Comedy Hour.

Bono is a trans man. In 1995, while then identifying as a woman, and several years after being outed as lesbian by the tabloid press, Bono publicly self-identified as a lesbian in a cover story in a leading American gay monthly magazine, The Advocate. Bono eventually went on to discuss the process of coming out to oneself and others in two books. Family Outing: A Guide to the Coming Out Process for Gays, Lesbians, and Their Families (1998) includes his coming-out account. The memoir The End of Innocence (2003) discusses his outing, music career, and partner Joan's death from non-Hodgkin's lymphoma.

Between 2008 and 2010, Bono underwent female-to-male gender transition. A two-part Entertainment Tonight feature in June 2009 explained that his transition had started a year before. In May 2010, he legally changed his gender and name. A documentary on Bono's experience, Becoming Chaz, was screened at the 2011 Sundance Film Festival and later made its television debut on the Oprah Winfrey Network.

Early life

Bono was born in Los Angeles, California, the only child of Cher and Sonny Bono of the pop duo Sonny & Cher, stars of a TV variety show on which the young child often appeared. Bono was named after the film Chastity, which was produced by Sonny and in which Cher (in her first solo role in a feature film) played a bisexual woman.

Bono was enrolled at the Fiorello H. LaGuardia High School of Music & Art and Performing Arts in New York City. Bono came out to both parents as a lesbian at age 18. In Family Outing, Bono wrote that, "as a child, I always felt there was something different about me. I'd look at other girls my age and feel perplexed by their obvious interest in the latest fashion, which boy in class was the cutest, and who looked the most like cover girl Christie Brinkley. When I was 13, I finally found a name for exactly how I was different. I realized I was gay."

Ceremony
Bono began a short music career in 1988 with the band Ceremony, which released one album, Hang Out Your Poetry, in 1993. The band featured Bono on vocals, acoustic guitar, and percussion. Other members were Steve March Tormé (backup vocals), Heidi Shink a.k.a. Chance, Pete McRae, Steve Bauman, Louis Ruiz, and Bryn Mathieu. All but one of the band's songs were written or co-written by Bono, Shink, and Mark Hudson. They used no synthesizers or digital effects on the album; Shink noted, "We turned our back on technology. [ ... ] It's reminiscent of the 60s, but more a tip of the hat than emulating it. We took the music we love and rejuvenated it, made it 90s." Critical reception of the album was lukewarm, with Roch Parisien of Allmusic describing Hang Out Your Poetry as a mildly psychedelic take on early 1990s pop, "pleasant, accessible, well-produced ear-candy that's ultimately toothless".

The songs "Could've Been Love" and "Ready for Love" were released as singles from the album. Sonny and Cher also recorded backing vocals for the track "Livin' It Up" on the album.

LGBT activism

In April 1995, Bono came out as a lesbian in an interview with The Advocate, a national gay and lesbian magazine. The 1998 book Family Outing detailed how Bono's coming out "catapulted me into a political role that has transformed my life, providing me with affirmation as a lesbian, as a woman, and as an individual." In the same book, Bono reported that Cher, who was both a gay icon and an ally of LGBT communities, was quite uncomfortable with the news at first and "went ballistic" before coming to terms with it: "By August 1996, one year after I came out publicly, my mother had progressed so far that she agreed to 'come out' herself on the cover of The Advocate as the proud mother of a lesbian daughter." Cher has since become an outspoken LGBT rights activist.

Bono's paternal relationship became strained after Sonny became a Republican Congressman from California. The differences in their political views separated them, and the two had not spoken for more than a year at the time of Sonny's fatal skiing accident in January 1998.

Bono worked as a writer at large for The Advocate. As a social activist, Bono became a spokesperson for the Human Rights Campaign, promoted National Coming Out Day, campaigned for the reelection of Bill Clinton for US president, campaigned against the Defense of Marriage Act, and served as Entertainment Media Director for the Gay and Lesbian Alliance Against Defamation (GLAAD). Bono was a team captain for Celebrity Fit Club 3 (2006) and was supported by girlfriend Jennifer Elia, who orchestrated exercise and training sessions.

In June 2016, the Human Rights Campaign released a video in tribute to the victims of the Orlando nightclub shooting; in the video, Bono and others told the stories of the people killed there.

Transition
In mid-2008, Bono began undergoing a physical and social transition from female to male. This was confirmed in June 2009 by his publicist, who identified Bono's name as Chaz Bono and said, "It is Chaz's hope that his choice to transition will open the hearts and minds of the public regarding this issue, just as his coming out did." GLAAD and the Empowering Spirits Foundation were quick to offer praise and support for the announcement. Bono's legal transition was completed on May 6, 2010, when a California court granted his request for a gender and name change. Bono made Becoming Chaz, a documentary film about his transition that premiered at the 2011 Sundance Film Festival. The Oprah Winfrey Network acquired the rights to the documentary and debuted it on May 10, 2011.

In September 2011, he became a competitor on the 13th season of the U.S. version of Dancing with the Stars, paired with professional ballroom dancer Lacey Schwimmer. The duo was eliminated on October 25, 2011. This was the first time an openly transgender man starred on a major network television show for something unrelated to being transgender.

Filmography

Film

Television

Bibliography
 Family Outing (with Billie Fitzpatrick) (1998). Little, Brown and Company. pp. 272. 
 The End of Innocence: A Memoir (with Michele Kort) (2003). pp. 232. 
 Transition: The story of how I became a man (with Billie Fitzpatrick) (2011). New York: Dutton. 
 Transition: Becoming Who I Was Always Meant to Be (with Billie Fitzpatrick) (2012 paperback). Plume. pp. 272.

Notes

References

External links

[ Allmusic.com entry on Bono's band Ceremony]

1969 births
Living people
20th-century American singers
20th-century American non-fiction writers
21st-century American non-fiction writers
Activists from California
Male actors from Los Angeles
American male child actors
American male non-fiction writers
American memoirists
American people of Armenian descent
American people of Italian descent
Fiorello H. LaGuardia High School alumni
Lee Strasberg Theatre and Film Institute alumni
Transgender memoirists
American LGBT musicians
LGBT people from California
American LGBT rights activists
Participants in American reality television series
Singers from Los Angeles
Songwriters from California
Sonny Bono
Transgender male actors
Transgender men
Transgender singers
Writers from Los Angeles
21st-century American male writers
American LGBT actors
Actors with dyslexia
20th-century American LGBT people
21st-century American LGBT people
American transgender writers